Nghiêm Văn Sẩn (born 10 May 1940) is a Vietnamese sports shooter. He competed in the mixed 50 metre rifle three positions event at the 1980 Summer Olympics.

References

External links
 

1940 births
Living people
Vietnamese male sport shooters
Olympic shooters of Vietnam
Shooters at the 1980 Summer Olympics
Place of birth missing (living people)